Sacrifice is a 2014 American thriller drama film written and directed by Michael Cohn and starring Dermot Mulroney, Melora Walters and Austin Abrams.

Cast
Luke Kleintank
Austin Abrams
Lewis Tan
Brandon Mychal Smith
James McDaniel
Melora Walters
Dermot Mulroney

Production
Filming occurred in The Woodlands, Texas and wrapped in May 2013.

Release
The film premiered at the Woodstock Film Festival in October 2014.

Reception
Ella Taylor of Variety gave the film a positive review and wrote, "Strong performances elevate this intermittently absorbing family melodrama from writer-director Michael Cohn."

References

External links
 
 

American thriller drama films
Films shot in Texas
2010s English-language films
2010s American films